Libertad is a department of the province of Chaco (Argentina).

References 

Departments of Chaco Province